The Shepherd from Trutzberg is a 1959 West German historical romance film directed by Eduard von Borsody and starring Heidi Brühl, Hans von Borsody and Franziska Kinz. It is a heimatfilm, based on a novel by Ludwig Ganghofer.

It was shot at the Bavaria Studios in Munich. The film's sets were designed by the art director Carl Ludwig Kirmse.

Cast

See also
 Die Trutze von Trutzberg (1922)

References

Bibliography

External links 
 

1959 films
West German films
1950s German-language films
Films directed by Eduard von Borsody
Films shot at Bavaria Studios
Bavaria Film films
1950s historical romance films
German historical romance films
Films set in the 15th century
Films set in the Holy Roman Empire
Films based on German novels
Films based on works by Ludwig Ganghofer
Remakes of German films
Sound film remakes of silent films
1950s German films